"Anything" is a song by rapper Jay-Z that is found on Beanie Sigel's 2000 album The Truth. It is produced by Sam Sneed and P. Skam, who sample Lionel Bart's "I'll Do Anything" for the track's beat and chorus. The sample from Oliver! heavily popularized "Anything", as did the Annie sample on "Hard Knock Life (Ghetto Anthem)", "Anything" was also a bonus track on Jay-Z's album Vol. 3... Life and Times of S. Carter (UK/Europe edition) as is "Anything (Mr. Drunk Mix)" on the Japanese version of the album.

Jay-Z admitted to Angie Martinez in a 2009 interview on the BET program Food for Thought that he hoped the song would be a success like "Hard Knock Life (Ghetto Anthem)" due to their similarities but was surprised when it wasn't, even saying "I dropped the record and then nothing".  The song did, however, achieve moderate success in the UK reaching #18 on the singles chart. A music video for the song was also released, which was directed by Chris Robinson.

"Anything (The Berlin Remixes)"

Formats and track listings

Vinyl 12"

A-side
 "Anything (GBZ Remix)"		
 "Anything (GBZ Remix Instrumental)"

B-side
 "Anything (DJ Tomekk Remix)"	
 "Anything (Original Version)"	
 "Anything (Original Version Instrumental)"

CD
 "Anything (Radio Edit)"
 "So Ghetto"
 "There's Been a Murder"
 "Anything (Video)"

Vinyl

A-side
 "Anything (Radio Edit) (3:47)"
 "Anything (LP Version) (4:47)"
 "Anything (Instrumental) (4:48)"

B-side
 "Big Pimpin' (Radio Edit) (3:56)"
 "Big Pimpin' (LP Version) (4:44)"
 "Big Pimpin' (Instrumental) (4:59)"

Charts

See also
List of songs recorded by Jay-Z

References

2000 singles
Jay-Z songs
Music videos directed by Chris Robinson (director)
Songs written by Jay-Z
Songs written by Lionel Bart
Roc-A-Fella Records singles
2000 songs